Mentzelia montana, known by the common name variegated bract blazingstar, is a species of flowering plant in the family Loasaceae.

Description
Mentzelia montana is an annual herb producing an erect stem approaching  in maximum height. The leaves are mostly unlobed, the longest in the basal rosette up to 13 centimeters long and those higher on the stem reduced in size.

The inflorescence is a narrow series of clusters of small flowers, each flower accompanied by a single toothed bract with a white base and green tip. The five yellow petals of the flower are up to 7 millimeters long and are sometimes marked with red at the bases.

The fruit is a narrow utricle up to 2 centimeters containing several tiny, angular seeds.

Taxonomy
The Latin specific epithet montana refers to mountains or coming from mountains.

Distribution
The plant is native to much of western North America including the western United States and northern Mexico. It is a member of the flora in many types of habitat, including coniferous forests, chaparral, sagebrush scrub, and deserts.

References

External links
Jepson Manual Treatment: Mentzelia montana
Mentzelia montana — U.C. Photo gallery

montana
Flora of Northwestern Mexico
Flora of the Western United States
Flora of California
Flora of Colorado
Flora of Montana
Flora of Nevada
Flora of New Mexico
Flora of Sonora
Flora of Texas
Flora of the Cascade Range
Flora of the California desert regions
Flora of the Great Basin
Flora of the Sierra Nevada (United States)
Flora without expected TNC conservation status